Todor Arkadi Todorov Artarski (born 30 January 1935) is a Bulgarian athlete. He competed in the men's discus throw at the 1960 Summer Olympics.

References

External links
 

1935 births
Living people
Athletes (track and field) at the 1960 Summer Olympics
Bulgarian male discus throwers
Olympic athletes of Bulgaria